Fritz John (14 June 1910 – 10 February 1994) was a German-born mathematician specialising in partial differential equations and ill-posed problems.  His early work was on the Radon transform and he is remembered for John's equation. He was a 1984 MacArthur Fellow.

Life and career
John was born in Berlin, Imperial Germany, the son of Hedwig (née Bürgel) and Hermann Jacobson-John. He studied mathematics from 1929 to 1933 in Göttingen where he was influenced by Richard Courant, among others. Following Hitler's rise to power in 1933 "non-aryans" were being expelled from teaching posts, and John, being half Jewish, emigrated from Germany to England.

John published his first paper in 1934 on Morse theory. He was awarded his doctorate in 1934 with a thesis entitled Determining a function from its integrals over certain manifolds from Göttingen. With Richard Courant's assistance he spent a year at St John's College, Cambridge. During this time he published papers on the Radon transform, a theme to which he would return throughout his career.

John was appointed an assistant professor at the University of Kentucky  in 1935 and he emigrated to the United States, becoming naturalised in 1941. He stayed at Kentucky until 1946, apart from between 1943 and 1945, during which he did war service for the Ballistic Research Laboratory at the Aberdeen Proving Ground, Maryland.  In 1946 he moved to New York University, where he remained for the rest of his career.

Throughout the 1940s and 1950s he continued to work on the Radon transform, in particular its application to  linear partial differential equations, convex geometry, and the mathematical theory of water waves. He also worked in numerical analysis and on ill-posed problems. His textbook on partial differential equations was highly influential and was re-edited many times. He made several contributions to convex geometry, including his famous result that within every convex body there is one unique ellipsoid of maximal volume, now called the
John Ellipsoid.

From the mid-1950s on, he started working on the theory of equilibrium nonlinear elasticity. He coauthored with Richard Courant the two-volume work Introduction to Calculus and Analysis, first published in 1965. He retired in 1981, but continued to work on nonlinear waves.

Honors

He received many awards during his career including the Birkhoff Prize in Applied Mathematics in 1973 and the Steele Prize in 1982. On 5 May 1985, jointly with Olga Arsenievna Oleinik, he was awarded the laurea honoris causa in mathematics by the Sapienza University of Rome.

Publications
. John's famous monograph on the Radon transform and its application to partial differential equations.
.
.
.

See also
Bounded mean oscillation
Fritz John conditions
John ellipsoid
John transform

Notes

References

. The "regest of honoris causa degrees from 1944 to 1985" (English translation of the title) is a detailed and carefully commented regest of all the documents of the official archive of the Sapienza University of Rome pertaining to the honoris causa degrees, awarded or not. It includes all the awarding proposals submitted during the considered period, detailed presentations of the work of the candidate, if available, and precise references to related articles published on Italian newspapers and magazines, if the laurea was awarded.

Further reading

1910 births
1994 deaths
20th-century American mathematicians
Mathematical analysts
Numerical analysts
New York University faculty
Jewish emigrants from Nazi Germany to the United States
American people of German-Jewish descent
MacArthur Fellows
PDE theorists